Garibaldi FS is a station on Lines 2 and 5 of the Milan Metro, and the Milan Passante railway. The Line 2 station was opened on 21 July 1971 as part of the extension from Centrale. It served as the western terminus until 3 March 1978, when the first trains could travel the new route to Cadorna. The Passante station was opened in 1997, and the Line 5 station in 2005.

The station is located on Viale Don Luigi Sturzo, near the Piazza Sigmund Freud, within the territory of the municipality of Milan. This is an underground station, located under Milano Porta Garibaldi railway station.

Garibaldi is the only Metro station in Milan, along with surface station Cascina Gobba, to have four tracks: two tracks are used for normal access to the trains, while the other two, located outside the platforms, are not used, one of them being partially removed. This peculiarity is due to the never-built project of expeditious lines of Brianza, a group of light rail lines that were supposed to replace the tram trunk of Brianza, reaching two of the four tracks at the station of Garibaldi, allowing a good exchange.

References

External links

Line 2 (Milan Metro) stations
Line 5 (Milan Metro) stations
Railway stations opened in 1971
1971 establishments in Italy
Railway stations in Italy opened in the 20th century